Albín Brunovský (25 December 1935, Zohor, Czechoslovakia – 20 January 1997, Bratislava, Slovakia) was a Slovak painter, graphic artist, lithographer, illustrator and pedagogue, considered one of the greatest Slovak painters of the 20th century.

Biography

Albín Brunovský was born in Zohor, Czechoslovakia on Christmas Day, 25 December 1935. Brunovský started his early career in art by working on stage set and poster design. He studied at the Academy of Fine Arts in Bratislava under Prof. Vincent Hložník from 1955 to 1961. The Hloznik School was well known for its high artistic and technical preparation in graphic arts and its humanist perspective. For the founder, as for many of his students, Goya's  great graphic cycle  "The Horrors of War" served as a pattern or model. Brunovský himself lectured at that Academy from 1966 to 1990. In 1981 he was appointed a professor, creating his own engraving school several years later. Brunovský's  work often mirrored that of the modern movement, citation art. Brunovský was also the designer of the last series of Czechoslovak banknotes. His illustrations were primarily for children's books.

Over the course of his career, Brunovsky experimented with various graphic techniques and was highly influenced in his subject matter by poetry and literature, as well, of course, as by other artists. While at school he used the techniques of woodcuts and linocuts. Soon after, however, he began experimenting with "scraper" and chalk lithography. Etching were the characteristic mode of his graphic art work during the mid-1960s. He was, however, a painter too. Many of his illustrations were done in watercolor and he eventually began to paint major works.

As his mastery of various techniques evolved over time, so too did his vision as an artist. When he was young, Brunovsky exhibited surrealistic tendencies—defined as a tendency to individualism and absurdity and the unchecked play of the subconscious. Later his work became more evaluative and critical of Man in relation to himself and society.

Quote
I have such a creative program that pushes me to work. My pictures are simply doing with me what they want. Sometimes I don't feel like working. But when I come to my studio and I notice, that one work is not ready and the other one hopeless, I go and sit next to them for a while and suddenly I realise that there is evening. And in this way every morning I let myself to be pleasantly abused by my paintings that allow me to dream. (Albín Brunovský)

[Slovak talent of the communist era] "grew in the vegetables" (Albín Brunovský)
[he uses] "nature and its elements to depict the reality of dreams" (Albín Brunovský)

Works
The Meeting of Numismatists
A Lady with a Hat
Vernissage in Nature
illustrations of "Modrá kniha rozprávok" - The Blue Book of Fairy Tales
Czechoslovak banknotes
seven pictures on walnut woods in the lobby of the new building of the National Council of the Slovak Republic

Footnotes

External links
Graphics and biography of Albin Brunovsky in German, English and Czech
Brunovsky (in Czech)
Brunovsky graphic works (English, Français, Nederlands)

1935 births
1997 deaths
Slovak artists
Slovak painters
Modern painters
Herder Prize recipients